The Institute of Translation & Interpreting (ITI) is a professional association representing translators, interpreters and language services businesses in the United Kingdom. ITI is affiliated with the International Federation of Translators (FIT).

History
ITI was founded in 1986, as a successor to the IOL's Translators' Guild. As the principal professional association of translators and interpreters in the United Kingdom, it has become one of the primary sources of information on translation and interpreting to government, industry, the media and the public. It was one of the bodies consulted regarding the creation of the EN 15038 European quality standard for the provision of translation services.

Aim
The Institute of Translation & Interpreting aims to promote the highest standards in the translation and interpreting professions. It achieves this through the publication of a bimonthly bulletin (the ITI Bulletin), blog posts and pamphlets, the organisation of regular conferences and courses linked to Continuing Professional Development, rigorous criteria for full membership including examinations and peer assessment, and a mentoring scheme for newcomers to the profession. The institute also worked together with the CIoL on the establishment and administration of the new designation of Chartered Linguist as well as collaborating with numerous other UK-based interpreting organizations in the umbrella body Professional Interpreters for Justice (PI4J/PIJ), to campaign against the new Ministry of Justice framework agreement for public service interpreting.

Membership
Although most of its members are based in the United Kingdom, ITI has members from across continental Europe and other countries where English is commonly used. The main grades of individual membership are Fellow, Qualified Member, Associate, Affiliate, Project Manager and Student, and there are categories for individual Supporters and Academics, with some Corporate Members, classified into Corporate – Language Services Providers, Corporate Education and Corporate Affiliate. In January 2022 the numbers included 62 Fellows, 1535 Members, 444 Associates, 301 Students and 87 Corporates, along with a handful of honorary and concessionary members, making a total of 3165. Members are bound by the institute's Code of Professional Conduct. Fellows and Qualified Members are entitled to use the postnominals FITI and MITI; the equivalent AITI for Associates was abolished when the precise definition of 'Associate' changed several times in around 2005, but was reinstated in 2013.

Bulletin Magazine
The Bulletin is published bi-monthly and has an estimated readership of 7000. As well as publicising ITI events, including conferences, workshops etc., it contains articles relating to translating and interpreting. Some editions include interviews with authors and articles on world issues running alongside regular features on the pitfalls of poor translation, reviews of translation software, taxation, money matters, and the many uses of translation and interpreting.

Conference
One of the highlights in the ITI Calendar is its conference, held every two years at different venues across the UK. The last face-to-face event before the pandemic was held at Cutlers' Hall in Sheffield in May 2019 and was attended by 375 people, while previous editions in recent years were held in locations such as Cardiff, Newcastle, Gatwick Airport, Birmingham and London. In years when there is no conference, the Institute organises a one-day event, most recently in London in 2018. It was planned to hold the next event in Bristol in June 2020, but this had to be cancelled due to COVID-19.
ITI's 2021 conference was held online in May 2021.
As Covid restrictions were reduced, the 2022 conference was held as a hybrid event, online and in Brighton on 31 May - 1 June 2022. 250 people attended the event, held at the Grand Hotel, Brighton, with a similar number online. Sessions were held across four streams, with three focused on translation, while the fourth stream was devoted to interpreting matters.

Covid-19
During the COVID-19 pandemic, the ITI continued to work to support its members by moving events online. During the early part of the first UK lockdown, an online coffee morning was held weekly, along with other online webinars offering training in a range of subjects. These were supplemented by online activities and events offered by regional groups and networks. Online events have continued and been developed into a permanent feature of the post-Covid CPD offering, with members getting access to a library of past events.

ITI networks
From the beginning, ITI members have sought to form groups based on regional, language and specialist lines. ITI has groups across all geographical areas of United Kingdom, including the ITI Scottish Network, ITI Cymru Wales, ITI London Regional Group. Language groups such as the German Network, Polish Network, French Network and Japanese Network (J-Net), as well as subject-based networks such as STEP and infotech, maintain internet-based groups for purposes such as the clarification of terminological queries, discussion of best practice, sharing work, and organizing social events.

References

External links
Official Website

Language interpretation
Organizations established in 1986
1986 establishments in the United Kingdom
Translation associations of the United Kingdom
Translation and Interpreting